Going Greek is a 2001 American comedy film written and directed by Justin Zackham.

Plot
Set in any-college U.S.A., centering on Jake, an embittered ex-high school American football star who is coerced into pledging the "coolest" fraternity on campus. Jake does so in order to protect Gil, his somewhat nerdy, but Greek-obsessed cousin. As the semester progresses, Jake struggles to maintain his grades as well as his affair with Paige, a beautiful sophomore who hates all fraternities. Through naked scavenger hunts, sorority ass-signings, all-night beer fests, keg parties, sorority swapping, and other creative pledge activities, Jake discovers that he's actually beginning to enjoy himself. But when some of the frat brothers step up their attempts to force Gil into quitting the house, both his scholarship and his relationship with Paige are threatened. Jake must swallow his pride and turn to his fellow pledges for help into seeing the big-hearted Gil through to the end, or risk losing everything. Jake quickly learns that no man is an island, and that the friends we make in college are friends for life.

Cast 

 Dylan Bruno as Jake
 Laura Harris as Paige
 Simon Rex as Thompson
 Dublin James as Gil
 Chris Owen as Davis
 Steve Monroe as Nick 
 Oliver Hudson as Ziegler
  Harvey Silver as T.J.
 Todd Giebenhain as Russ
 Corey Pearson as Sully
 Charlie Talbert as Dooly 
 Susan Ward as Wendy
 Tom Bower as Bill
 Evan Jones as Stoner Roommate

Filming locations
Most of the college campus scenes were filmed at the University of California, Riverside in Riverside, CA.

External links
 

2001 films
2001 comedy films
2000s coming-of-age comedy films
American independent films
American coming-of-age comedy films
Films about fraternities and sororities
2001 independent films
Films scored by Nathan Barr
2000s English-language films
2000s American films